The 1984 Cork Senior Football Championship was the 96th staging of the Cork Senior Football Championship since its establishment by the Cork County Board in 1887. The draw for the opening round fixtures took place on 29 January 1984. The championship began on 15 April 1984 and ended on 14 October 1984.

Nemo Rangers entered the championship as the defending champions, however, they were beaten by Carbery in the second round.

On 14 October 1984, Imokilly won the championship following a 1-14 to 2-07 defeat of St. Finbarr's in the final. This was their first ever championship title.

Duhallow's Niall O'Connor was the championship's top scorer with 2-17.

Results

First round

Second round

Quarter-finals

Semi-finals

Final

Championship statistics

Top scorers

Overall

In a single game

Miscellaneous

 Imokilly win their first football title.

References

Cork Senior Football Championship